Mathis Soudi (born 26 November 1999) is a Moroccan slalom canoeist who has competed at the international level since 2016. He is from Rennes, France and competes in the K1 discipline for Morocco.

Soudi won a gold medal at the 2019 Arab Championships in Egypt. He finished in 22nd place at the 2016 Junior World Championships in Kraków and 16th the following year in Bratislava. Mathis earned his best senior world championship result of 52nd at the 2019 event in La Seu d'Urgell. He finished in 11th place at the 2020 World Cup in Pau.

Mathis represented Morocco in the K1 event at the delayed 2020 Summer Olympics in Tokyo, after he secured a quota place by finishing as the first eligible athlete at the African Olympic canoe slalom qualifiers in La Seu d'Urgell. With fellow Moroccan Célia Jodar competing in the women's K1 event, this marked the first time an African nation has sent both a male and female to compete in canoe slalom at the Games. Soudi set the 7th fastest time in the first run of the heats, qualifying in 15th place for the semifinal. He finished in 18th place overall.

References

External links 

 
 
 
 

1999 births
Living people
Moroccan male canoeists
Canoeists at the 2020 Summer Olympics
Olympic canoeists of Morocco